Bavdek (in older sources also Bavdki) is a small settlement in the Municipality of Velike Lašče in Slovenia. Traditionally the area is part of Lower Carniola. It is now included in the Central Slovenia Statistical Region.

References

External links
Bavdek on Geopedia

Populated places in the Municipality of Velike Lašče